Lena Kourkoutis is a physicist working in the field of electron microscopy, and a professor of applied and engineering physics at Cornell University. Her research focuses on the use of aberration-corrected scanning transmission electron microscope, providing atomic resolution, at cryogenic temperatures (>77K) to study physical processes such as superconductivity and biological structures such as proteins.

Education and career 

Kourkoutis received her Diplom in Physics from the University of Rostock, in Germany in 2003, and conducted her doctoral research at Cornell University, which she completed in 2009. She then moved back to Germany as a Humboldt Research Fellow at the Max Planck Institute in Martinsried between 2011 a 2012, before returning to Cornell University in 2013, first as a postdoctoral fellow, before joining the faculty. 
In 2016, Kourkoutis Presidential Early Career Award for Scientists and Engineers.

Awards and honors 
 2022 Fellow of the American Physical Society
 2020 Kurt Heinrich Awards of the Microanalysis Society
 2018 Burton Medal from the Microscopy Society of America. 
 2016 Presidential Early Career Award for Scientists and Engineers.
 2014 Packard Fellowship for Science and Engineering
 2013 Albert Crewe Award

References

External links

University of Rostock alumni
Cornell University alumni
Living people
American women physicists
Year of birth missing (living people)
American physicists
Fellows of the American Physical Society